Indian Brook may refer to:

 Indian Brook, Victoria, Nova Scotia, on Cape Breton Island
 Indian Brook Band, a First Nations government of Mi'kmaq people
 Indian Brook 14, Shubenacadie First Nation, Nova Scotia, an Indian Reserve for Mi'kmaq people
 Indian Brook Reservoir, Essex, Vermont, a drinking water impoundment reservoir
 Indian Brook Town Conservation Area, a natural preserve to secure the Indian Brook Reservoir
 Indian Brook Valley, a valley flooded to create the Indian Brook Reservoir
 Indian Brook, a brook dammed to create the Indian Brook Reservoir
 Indian Brook Road Historic District, Garrison, New York

See also

 
 
 Indian (disambiguation)
 Brook (disambiguation)
 Indian Creek (disambiguation)
 Indian Run (disambiguation)
 Indian River (disambiguation)
 Indian Stream (disambiguation)